The canton of Les Coteaux de Guyenne is an administrative division of the Lot-et-Garonne department, southwestern France. It was created at the French canton reorganisation which came into effect in March 2015. Its seat is in Duras.

It consists of the following communes:
 
Agmé
Auriac-sur-Dropt
Baleyssagues
Cambes
Castelnau-sur-Gupie
Caubon-Saint-Sauveur
Duras
Escassefort
Esclottes
Jusix
Lachapelle
Lagupie
Lévignac-de-Guyenne
Loubès-Bernac
Mauvezin-sur-Gupie
Monteton
Montignac-Toupinerie
Moustier
Pardaillan
Puymiclan
Saint-Astier
Saint-Avit
Saint-Barthélemy-d'Agenais
Sainte-Colombe-de-Duras
Saint-Géraud
Saint-Jean-de-Duras
Saint-Martin-Petit
Saint-Pierre-sur-Dropt
Saint-Sernin
La Sauvetat-du-Dropt
Savignac-de-Duras
Seyches
Soumensac
Villeneuve-de-Duras

References

Cantons of Lot-et-Garonne